Mohammad Ali (born 22 December 1982) is a Pakistani cricketer. He played in 29 first-class and 31 List A matches between 2001 and 2014. He made his Twenty20 debut on 25 April 2005, for Multan Tigers in the 2004–05 National Twenty20 Cup.

References

External links
 

1982 births
Living people
Pakistani cricketers
Multan cricketers
Pakistan Customs cricketers